Evgeni Kharadze (October 31, 1907 – October 10, 2001) was a Georgian astronomer, public figure and statesman. Member of the Academy of Sciences of the Soviet Union (1984), full member of the Georgian Academy of Sciences (1955).

Seventeenth rector of the Tbilisi State University (1959–1966), vice-president (1972–1980) and president (1980–1986) of the Georgian SSR Academy of Sciences. Vice-President of International Astronomical Union (1976–1982), director of Abastumani Astrophysical Observatory (1932–1992). A member of the Communist Party of the Soviet Union from 1942.

Kharadze was born in Tbilisi, October 31, 1907 into the family of an employee of the Transcaucasus Railway. In 1930 he graduated from Tbilisi State University. Since 1949 he has been a Professor of the same University. Kharadze's monograph “Catalogue of the Color Indices of 14000 Stars and Investigation of Light Absorption in the Galaxy on the Basis of Color Indices of Stars” was published in 1952. He was the author of a fundamental handbook “The Course of General Astrophysics” and two volumes of “Principles of Astronomy” in Georgian. The asteroid 1247 discovered by the Richard Martin West was named after Evgeni Kharadze.

References

 

1907 births
2001 deaths
Scientists from Tbilisi
Full Members of the USSR Academy of Sciences
Members of the Georgian National Academy of Sciences
Ninth convocation members of the Supreme Soviet of the Soviet Union
Tenth convocation members of the Supreme Soviet of the Soviet Union
Eleventh convocation members of the Supreme Soviet of the Soviet Union
Tbilisi State University alumni
Rectors of Tbilisi State University
Honoured Scientists of Georgia (country)
Recipients of the Order of Friendship of Peoples
Recipients of the Order of Honor (Georgia)
Recipients of the Order of Lenin
Recipients of the Order of the Red Banner of Labour
Astronomers from Georgia (country)
Soviet astronomers